Prostanthera phylicifolia, commonly known as spiked mint-bush, is a species of plant in the family Lamiaceae. It is an erect shrub with four-ridged branches, narrow egg-shaped to oval leaves and white or pale lilac-coloured flowers with purple and yellow spots.

Description

Taxonomy
Prostanthera phylicifolia was first formally described by Victorian Government Botanist Ferdinand von Mueller in 1858 in his book Fragmenta Phytographiae Australiae.

Distribution and habitat
This species occurs on hillsides and granite outcrops in heath and woodland in south-eastern New South Wales, the Australian Capital Territory and north-eastern Victoria. In Queensland, the specimen Prostanthera sp. 'Minyon Falls' (J.B.Williams NE61356) I.Telford is included in P. phylicifolia.

Use in horticulture
Prostanthera 'Poorinda Snow Queen' and 'Poorinda Ballerina', hybrid crosses of P. lasianthos and P. phylicifolia, are cultivated.

References

phylicifolia
Flora of Queensland
Flora of New South Wales
Flora of Victoria (Australia)
Flora of the Australian Capital Territory
Taxa named by Ferdinand von Mueller
Plants described in 1858